The England women's cricket team toured Australia during the 2013–14 season, where they successfully defended The Women's Ashes.

The series was played five months after the Australian women's 2013 tour of England, and followed the men's 2013–14 Ashes series. It retained the same point format adopted for the 2013 Women's Ashes: the Ashes were decided based on a points system, taking account not only of the one Test match, but also the results of limited-overs games. Six points are awarded for a Test victory (two points to each side in the event of a draw), and two points for a victory in any of the WODIs and WT20I games.

The only Test match of the tour took place on 10–13 January at Perth. England won the match by 61 runs. Three One Day Internationals were played: the first and second at Melbourne on 19 and 23 January were won by England and Australia respectively, and the third at Hobart on 26 January, was won by Australia. Three Twenty20 matches were also played, scheduled as "double-headed" events alongside the men's T20 matches between Australia and England. England won the first T20 at Hobart on 29 January, giving them an unassailable 10–4 points lead in the series, and thus retaining the Women's Ashes. The final two T20 matches played on 31 January and 2 February, at Melbourne and Sydney respectively were both won by Australia. The three T20s were double-headers along with men's T20 Matches.

In-between tourists also played a match against the Australia A Women on 6–7 January at Floreat Park Oval, Perth, which was drawn.
They also played a 50-overs limited over warm-up against Cricket Australia Chairman's Women's XI on 19 January at Junction Oval, Melbourne, won by CA Women's XI by 2 wickets.

The final points total was Australia 8, England 10.

Test Match

WODI series

1st WODI

2nd WODI

3rd WODI

WT20I series

1st WT20I

2nd WT20I

3rd WT20I

Results

Statistics

Batting
Most runs

Bowling
Most wickets

References

External links
ESPN Cricinfo:Fixtures and Results
BBC Sport: points system
ESPN Cricinfo: points system retained

January 2014 sports events in Australia
February 2014 sports events in Australia
The Women's Ashes
Women's international cricket tours of Australia
2014 in English women's cricket
2013–14 Australian women's cricket season
Australia 2014